Lowes or similar words may refer to:

Businesses
 Lowe's, a big box home improvement chain
 Lowes Foods, an American grocery store chain
 Lowes Menswear, an Australian menswear chain
 Lowe's Market, a regional supermarket chain with locations in Texas, New Mexico, Colorado, and Arizona

Other uses
 Lowes, Kentucky, United States
 Lowe's syndrome, a rare genetic condition causing various mental and physical disabilities

People with the surname
 Arnold Lowes (1919–1994), English footballer
 Bob Lowes (born 1963), Canadian ice hockey coach
 James Lowes (born 1969), English rugby league footballer
 John Livingston Lowes (1867–1945), American scholar of English literature

See also
 Lowe (disambiguation)
 Loews (disambiguation)